Gu Kaizhi (c. 344–406), courtesy name Changkang, was a Chinese painter and politician. He was a celebrated painter of ancient China. He was born in Wuxi and first painted at Nanjing in 364. In 366, he became an officer (Da Sima Canjun or Assistant to the Minister of Defense, 大司馬參軍). Later he was promoted to royal officer (Sanji Changshi or Gentleman in Waiting to the Emperor, 散騎常侍). He was also a talented poet and calligrapher. He wrote three books about painting theory: On Painting, Introduction of Famous Paintings of Wei and Jin Dynasties and Painting Yuntai Mountain. He wrote: "In figure paintings the clothes and the appearances were not very important. The eyes were the spirit and the decisive factor."

Gu's art is known today through copies of several silk handscroll paintings attributed to him.

Biography
Gu Kaizhi was born in Wuxi (in modern Jiangsu) where his father served in the imperial secretariat as an assistant. At about nineteen he was employed as aide to the Grand Marshal Huan Wen. He held an succession of minor official posts under various leaders of the Eastern Jin court.

One emperor under whom Gu Kaizhi served was Huan Xuan. An enthusiastic art collector, ahead of his accession Huan Xuan ordered a big boat to store paintings and other treasures so that they could be easily transported to safety in case of war. Gu Kaizhi entrusted to the emperor a sealed chest with his most precious works. The emperor broke open the box, stole the paintings, then repaired and returned it to the artist with the seals intact. Upon discovering his loss, Gu Kaizhi said that "the marvelous works partook of divine power, transformed themselves and vanished, like men ascending to join the immortals."

Works

The Admonitions of the Instructress to the Court Ladies (女史箴圖)

This painting, dated between the 6th and 8th century AD—probably an early Tang dynasty copy—illustrates nine stories from a political satire about Empress Jia Nanfeng written by Zhang Hua (ca. 232–302). Beginning in the eighth century, many collectors and emperors left seals, poems, and comments on the scroll. The Admonitions scroll was stored in the emperor's treasure until it was looted by the British army in the Boxer Uprising in 1900. Now it is in the British Museum collection, missing the first three scenes. There is another surviving copy of this painting, made during the Song dynasty and is now held in the Palace Museum in Beijing. The Song version is complete in twelve scenes.

The painting is on silk and is a polychrome. "The figures, whose countenances are at once solemn and tranquil, are described with a thin, unmodulated brush-line.... The brush-mode...has been described as 'spring silkworms spitting silk'".

Nymph of the Luo River (洛神賦)
Nymph of the Luo River is a painting by Gu which illustrates a poem written by Cao Zhi (192–232). It survives in three copies dating to the Song dynasty. One copy is now held in the Palace Museum in Beijing, and another one is now at the Freer Gallery in Washington, D.C. The third was brought to Manchuria by the last emperor Pu Yi (1906–1967) while he was the puppet emperor of Manchukuo under Japanese rule. When the Japanese surrendered in 1945 the painting disappeared. After ten years the Liaoning Province Museum recovered it.

Wise and Benevolent Women (列女仁智圖)
Wise and Benevolent Women survives in a 13th-century copy dating to the Song dynasty, and is today located in the Palace Museum in Beijing. It illustrates a subset of the women described in the Han dynasty work Biographies of Exemplary Women. The 5-meter-long scroll is divided into 10 sections, with each section containing a short description.

Notes

References

 Ci hai bian ji wei yuan hui. Ci hai. Shanghai: Shanghai ci shu chu ban she, 1979.

Further reading

External links

The Admonitions Scroll in the British Museum
洛神賦图在线高清展览

344 births
406 deaths
Jin dynasty (266–420) painters
Jin dynasty (266–420) politicians
Painters from Wuxi
Politicians from Wuxi
4th-century Chinese painters
5th-century Chinese painters